Carriglea Park was an industrial school in Dún Laoghaire, Ireland. The Christian Brothers purchased the property in 1893. 

It was first certified as an Industrial School in 1894 and started operating in 1896. It was located in Kill O'The Grange in south County Dublin, at the junction of Kill Avenue and Rochestown Avenue. The site is now the location of the Quadrangle Building in Dún Laoghaire Institute of Art, Design and Technology, a third level institute of technology with over 2000 students.

History

The idea behind establishing Carriglea was that it would be "Artane on a small scale".

The mansion was used as residence for the Christian Brothers and a separate building was built for the dormitory, dining room, kitchen and classrooms.

Closure
The school officially closed on 30 June 1954.

When the Congregation decided to close Carriglea Park, it decided that admissions to St Joseph's Industrial School, Letterfrack would be restricted to those boys whose offences would have resulted in a prison sentence for an adult. This was strongly opposed by the Department of Education and Skills, Department of Justice and members of the judiciary, but the Brothers were adamant and went ahead with the plan.

The Dún Laoghaire College of Art and Design moved to the site in the early 1980s, expanding into the Dún Laoghaire Institute of Art, Design and Technology (IADT) in 1997 with several more buildings constructed over the years.

Commission to Inquire into Child Abuse

Physical abuse

The Commission concluded that when discipline had broken down, the Congregation approved the appointment of a man known to practice excessive corporal punishment and that they considered this an appropriate approach.

Sexual abuse

The Commission concluded that there was a problem with abuse of boys by other boys. They noted that a Brother had been transferred from Artane Industrial school to Carriglea after concerns had been expressed about his friendship with a particular boy in Artane – this was condemned as "ill-judged and dangerous".

Two specific Brothers were noted as having histories of abuse – they were given the pseudonyms Brother Tristan and Brother Lancelin.

Brother Tristan was probably known to be an abuser by the General Council, but was moved on and kept employed in the industrial school system. He had committed offences at Carriglea and Marino. The Commission found that the records of the General Council showed that they regarded his offences as being much more serious than the submission to the Commission by the Christian Brothers had indicated.

Brother Lancelins offences were serious enough to be described with language that would be used of criminal offences, contradicting the submission made by the Congregation to the Commission. The Commission described one offence in particular as a "serious case of sexual abuse". Unusually for the 1940s, the boys made written statements about the abuse.

Emotional abuse and neglect

Carriglea Park was "dilapidated and run-down" for most of the period of the Commissions remit.

Boys were badly clothed and went barefoot in summer despite adequate funds being available.

Education and trades
Primary school education at Carriglea appears to have been of a relatively high standard.

The Commission praised the practice of preparing boys for the Postal Office exam, but regretted that the practice of sending brighter boys to the Christian Brothers secondary school in Dún Laoghaire was discontinued.

Trades were for the benefit of the institution, not the boys and only two were offered apart from farming. Boys in Carriglea were not provided with work skills for after their time in the school.

General conclusions
The Congregation had adequate funds to provide reasonable care for the boys sent to Carriglea, but didn't do so. The Congregation made considerable profit from closing Carriglea Park but did not use it to benefit boys.

Chronic mismanagement and a harsh regieme caused abuse.

Discipline was enforced by harsh and violent means to introduce order, with no regard for the boys welfare.

Sexual abuse by two Brothers was noted.

Primary education was good, but trades preparation was poor.

The school was dilapidated and poorly run.

References

Dún Laoghaire
History of County Dublin
Youth detention centers
Boys' schools in the Republic of Ireland
Education in Dún Laoghaire–Rathdown
Industrial schools in the Republic of Ireland
Defunct Catholic schools in Ireland
Defunct schools in the Republic of Ireland
Educational institutions disestablished in 1954
1893 establishments in Ireland
Educational institutions established in 1893
Violence against men in Europe